Qalat-e Markazi-ye Hamidabad (also Romanized as Qalāt-e Markazī-ye Ḩamīdābād; also known as Qalāt-e Ḩamīdābād-e Markazī) is a village in Sarrud-e Jonubi Rural District, in the Central District of Boyer-Ahmad County, Kohgiluyeh and Boyer-Ahmad Province, Iran. At the 2006 census, its population was 104, in 32 families.

References 

Populated places in Boyer-Ahmad County